José Antonio Julio Onésimo Sánchez Ferlosio, better known as Chicho Sánchez Ferlosio (Madrid, April 8, 1940 – July 1, 2003), was a Spanish singer-songwriter, and the author of numerous songs performed by other artists, such as Rolando Alarcón, Joan Baez, Soledad Bravo, Víctor Jara, Quilapayún and Joaquín Sabina.

He was the son of the writer and founding member of the Falange, Rafael Sánchez Mazas, brother of the writer Rafael Sánchez Ferlosio and the mathematician and philosopher Miguel Sánchez Ferlosio.

Politics 

Though his father was one of the founding member of the fascist Falange, Ferlosio was a leftist militant whose politics gradually moved further away from Stalinism and orthodox leftism towards anarchism following the death of Franco. He was first a militant in the Partido Comunista de España, but after visiting the People's Socialist Republic of Albania and seeing the repressive and hypocritical government there, as well as becoming influenced by his friend the poet Agustín García Calvo, he turned away from all forms of state-socialism and considered himself an anarchist. His new stance could be summed up in his belief that "ideas are for men, and not men for ideas".

Discography 

Ferlosio, a prolific composer, only recorded a small part of his repertoire. His official discography includes only one LP A Contratiempo. However, many artists have adapted his songs.

External links 
 Canciones de la resistencia española. 1964. Investigación sobre el disco sueco de Chicho Sánchez Ferlosio. 
 Fotografía de Chicho Sánchez Ferlosio
 Hasta que el cuerpo aguante
 Romancero de Durruti

Spanish singer-songwriters
1940 births
2003 deaths
Musicians from Madrid
20th-century Spanish singers
Political music artists
Spanish anarchists